Lincoln Center is a  tall high-rise office building located 1660 Lincoln Street in Denver, Colorado. It was completed in 1972 and has 30 floors. According to Skyscraperpage.com, it is the 26th tallest building in Denver.

It was designed by William C. Muchow & Associates and built by the Al Cohen Construction Company.

See also
List of tallest buildings in Denver

References

Skyscraper office buildings in Denver
Office buildings completed in 1972